Cutaway is a 2014 Canadian drama short film, written and directed by Kazik Radwanski. Told entirely without spoken dialogue, the film depicts a day in a man's life entirely through a close focus on his hands, including his performance of physical labour and text conversations with his girlfriend.

The film was named to the Toronto International Film Festival's year-end Canada's Top Ten list for 2014.

References

External links
 

2014 films
Films directed by Kazik Radwanski
Canadian drama short films
2010s Canadian films
2000s Canadian films